Euterebra is a genus of sea snails, marine gastropod mollusks in the family Terebridae, the auger snails.

This genus has become a synonym of Duplicaria Dall, 1908

Species
, species within the genus Euterebra include:
 Euterebra mariato  is accepted as Columbellidae_incertae_sedis mariato (Pilsbry & H. N. Lowe, 1932)
Species brought into synonymy
 Euterebra angelli : synonym of Neoterebra angelli (J. Gibson-Smith & W. Gibson-Smith, 1984)
 Euterebra assecla : synonym of Gradaterebra assecla (Iredale, 1924)
 Euterebra capensis : synonym of Duplicaria capensis (E. A. Smith, 1873)
 Euterebra fuscobasis : synonym of Partecosta fuscobasis (E. A. Smith, 1877)
 Euterebra fuscocincta : synonym of Partecosta fuscocincta (E. A. Smith, 1877)
 Euterebra fuscolutea : synonym of Partecosta fuscolutea (Bozzetti, 2008)
 Euterebra herosae : synonym of Partecosta herosae (Terryn & Rosado, 2011)
 Euterebra kowiensis : synonym of Gradaterebra kowiensis (W. H. Turton, 1932)
 Euterebra lightfooti : synonym of Gradaterebra lightfooti (E. A. Smith, 1899)
 Euterebra macandrewii : synonym of Partecosta macandrewii (E. A. Smith, 1877)
 Euterebra padangensis : synonym of Partecosta padangensis (Thiele, 1925)
 Euterebra planecosta : synonym of Gradaterebra planecosta (Barnard, 1958)
 Euterebra puncturosa : synonym of Neoterebra puncturosa (Berry, 1959)
 Euterebra riosi : synonym of Neoterebra riosi (Bratcher & Cernohorsky, 1985)
 Euterebra sandrinae : synonym of Partecosta sandrinae (Aubry, 2008)
 Euterebra scalariformis : synonym of Gradaterebra scalariformis 
 Euterebra severa : synonym of Gradaterebra severa (Melvill, 1897)
 Euterebra tantilla : synonym of Partecosta tantilla (E. A. Smith, 1873)
 Euterebra taylori : synonym of Gradaterebra taylori (Reeve, 1860)
 Euterebra tristis : synonym of Duplicaria tristis (Deshayes, 1859)

References

Terebridae